The 1998 Dura Lube 200 was the second round of the 1998 Indy Racing League. The race was held on March 22, 1998 at the  Phoenix International Raceway in Avondale, Arizona.

Report

Qualifying

Grid limited to 28 cars. Positions 1-26 determined by qualifying speed. Positions 27-28 reserved for provisionals (based on entrant points).

Race
The difference between the fastest and slowest qualifier was the 2nd closest in Indycar history at Phoenix, which, combined with traction problems in turn 2 caused by a dip in the pavement, made for a rough race. Shockingly, neither the defending race champion, Jim Guthrie, nor his previous team Blueprint Racing (with Robbie Groff) qualified. Speeds were up from the previous year, and six cars broke the new-car track record led by surprise pole winner Jeff Ward, who jumped out to the early lead and held it until he encountered gearbox problems. He eventually lost fifth gear and was handicapped on restarts, although once up to speed he was still one of the fastest cars on the track. Eddie Cheever, from 20th starting position, moved into the top 10 by lap 11. Buddy Lazier dropped out early when he lost an engine and crashed in turn 3. On lap 19, John Paul Jr. started a long sequence of incidents in turn 2 when he spun there.

After Ward's transmission malfunctioned, Tony Stewart took over the lead for almost 100 more laps. In between, Kenny Bräck, Billy Boat and Ward battled for position while Sharp moved up through the field. On lap 32, Sharp's teammate Mark Dismore wrecked in turn 2, and lost some laps before returning to the race, something that would be significant for the outcome of the race. Rookie J. J. Yeley surprised qualifying 10th in his first IRL start, but he spun in turn 2 on lap 46. Davey Hamilton tried to squeeze by on the outside but slid into the wall and then into Yeley. Another first-timer, Dave Steele, was involved in a frightening accident at the same spot on lap 59. Eliseo Salazar spun and collected Steele and Robbie Buhl. Trying to avoid him, Arie Luyendyk touched wheels with Salazar. Luyendyk's car went up and over, and slid through turn 2 upside down. The Dutch had significant damage to his helmet from the pavement but only had a hand burn caused by scraping the asphalt during the spin.

Cheever had moved into the lead prior to this yellow, but lost a lap when his crew got the left and right rear tires reversed on a pit stop, and he never managed to make up the lap. Then, Stéphan Grégoire moved into second place behind Stewart. Buzz Calkins was picking up his lap times, and after a caution for Paul Durant's blown engine on lap 106, he made up a lap and joined the lead pack, but he got hit by debris when Paul Jr. wrecked on lap 133 and had to put for a new nose, losing again a lap. At this point, Stewart still led, with Bräck pursuing him but being unable to catch the leader. Pit strategy came into play on lap 169 when Sam Schmidt spun in turn 2. All cars on the lead lap cars pitted with the exception of Sharp, who decided to gamble on fuel.

After the green flag on lap 174, Sharp quickly opened up a 3-second lead in traffic but then had to slow to conserve fuel. On lap 186, Bräck got caught in a four wide pass in the back stretch dogleg and he touched wheels with Mike Groff. Both crashed hard and Groff had to be cut out of his car. Groff was taken to the hospital, examined, and released. The resulting long caution allowed Sharp to conserve fuel. The green waved with 2 laps to go. Between the leaders was Dismore, many laps down but running fast. Dismore bogged down at the start and held up Stewart and Boat. The race would end in that order: despite the controversy that erupted following the race, Dismore claimed to not have received any "team orders", but he was fined $5,000 for "unsportsmanlike conduct". Sharp was also fined $15,000 and docked 7 points for "failing to meet the fuel tank capacity requirement", as his car held more fuel than allowed. Grégoire's unsponsored car logged its second consecutive fourth-place finish, and Ward finished fifth. Schmidt, with an underfunded team, managed his best finish ever in the IRL with a 7th place despite two spins. Scott Sharp got his second IRL victory; his first in the new cars.

Race Statistics
 Lead changes: 6 among 5 drivers

Standings after the race

Drivers' Championship standings

 Note: Only the top five positions are included for the standings.

References

External links
 IndyCar official website

1998 in IndyCar
Dura Lube 200